Ibones de Anayet are a series of lakes in the Province of Huesca, northeastern Spain. They lie at the foot of Pico de Anayet.

References

Anayet
Geography of the Province of Huesca